Two ships operated by W France, Fenwick & Co Ltd were named Dalewood:

, torpedoed and sunk by SM U-105 on 26 February 1918.
, sold to Germany in 1923.

Ship names